Aaron Scott may refer to:
 Aaron Scott (musician)
 Aaron Scott (footballer)